Star Radio is an Independent Local Radio station broadcasting on 100.7 MHz in Cambridge, 107.1 MHz in Ely, 107.3 MHz in Saffron Walden, and 107.9 MHz in Haverhill. It was originally launched as "Cambridge Café Radio". Later in 1998 it was relaunched as "Cambridge Red" and six months later as 107.9 The Eagle.

In 1999, the UKRD Group purchased the station. The following year it renamed Red as "107.9 The Eagle", in line with the other stations they owned. In 2001, UKRD rebranded the station again to Star 107.9, in line with the rebranding of their other stations.

As of December 2022, the station has a weekly audience of 35,000 listeners according to RAJAR.

Station Merger
In 2003, Star 107.1/5 in Ely and The Fens split frequencies. 107.5 in Wisbech became Fen Radio 107.5, and 107.1 in Ely became a relay of Star 107.9. Because of this, the station adjusted their name to 107 Star FM. The name was adjusted again in 2004 to Star 107. Star 107 was rebranded in August 2005 as 'Star Radio' coinciding with the rebrand of the other 'Star' network stations in the UKRD Group.

On 1 January 2017 the station was sold to Mid Anglia Media Ltd and in 2019 the licence was transferred to Light Blue Media Cambridge.

In July 2020, the station moved its main frequency to 100.7 MHz from 107.9 MHz and at the same time substantially increased its transmission power whilst relocating its transmitter to the Arqiva Madingley site.

In November 2020, a new transmitter for Haverhill was switched on using the former 107.9 MHz frequency.

As of January 2021, the station is available across Cambridgeshire and Peterborough on DAB digital radio.

See also
Fen Radio 107.5
KL.FM 96.7

References

External links
Official site

Star 107